Gonda Lok Sabha constituency is one of the 80 Lok Sabha (parliamentary) constituencies in Uttar Pradesh state in northern India.

Assembly Segments

Members of Parliament

Results

2019

2014

See also
 Gonda district
 List of Constituencies of the Lok Sabha

References

Lok Sabha constituencies in Uttar Pradesh
Gonda district